"I Saw the Light" is a song written and performed by American musician Todd Rundgren that was released as the opening track from his 1972 album Something/Anything?. In the album's liner notes, Rundgren states that he intended the song to be the hit of the album, and copied the Motown tradition of putting hit songs at the beginning of albums. 

Rundgren wrote the track in 20 minutes, a feat he attributes to his reliance on stimulants such as Ritalin. "It caused me to crank out songs at an incredible pace. You can see why, too, the rhymes are just moon/June/spoon kind of stuff."

Appearances
"I Saw The Light" features in the first episode of the Sex and the City spinoff And Just Like That..., and the films My Girl, Kingpin, American Hustle, A Very Murray Christmas, and Licorice Pizza, when the main character, Gary sees Alana with his former co-star Lance.

The song is also heard in season 3, episode 11 of Six Feet Under and season 4, episode 11 of Ozark. It is featured on Supernatural Season 10, episode 19. 

In 2022, the song was featured in advertisements for the UK gambling website Gala Bingo.

Personnel
 Todd Rundgren – all instruments and vocals

Charts
Weekly charts

Year-end charts

Cover versions

 1972 – The New Seekers, Circles 
 1985 – Yukihiro Takahashi, Once a Fool
 1984 – Herman Brood, The Brood (as "Eyes")
 1987 – Mood Six, "I Saw the Light" (A video for the song made the rounds on MTV's "120 Minutes")
 1989 – Workshy, The Golden Mile.
 1997 – Terry Hall, Laugh (released as a single)
 1997 – Lori Carson, Everything I Touch Runs Wild.
 1998 – Hal Ketchum, I Saw the Light. It reached No. 36 on the US country charts, and No. 50 on the Canadian country charts.
 2012 – Yo La Tengo, Super Hits of the Seventies (also released on deluxe versions of their Fade)
 2013 – Tabea, Memories
 2015 – Jason Schwartzman, Rashida Jones, Maya Rudolph, David Johansen and Bill Murray, A Very Murray Christmas

References

1972 songs
1972 singles
1998 singles
Todd Rundgren songs
Songs written by Todd Rundgren
Song recordings produced by Todd Rundgren
Bearsville Records singles
Curb Records singles
Hal Ketchum songs